The Qalqutan (Qalqūtan; , Koluton) is a river of the Akmola Region, Kazakhstan. It is a right tributary of the Ishim.

Rivers of Kazakhstan